Esquina Department is a  department of Corrientes Province in Argentina.

Settlements 
 Esquina
 Puerto Libertador

External links 
  

Departments of Corrientes Province